Naumoski is a surname predominantly from North Macedonia. Notable people with the surname include:

 Ilčo Naumoski (born 1983), Macedonian footballer
 Petar Naumoski (born 1968), Macedonian basketball player
 Sandre Naumoski (born 1979), Macedonian American indoor footballer